Pyotr Ivanovich Pochynchuk (July 26, 1954 – December 1, 1991) was a Soviet athlete who mainly competed in the men's 20 kilometer walk during his career. Born in Lyakhovichi, Brest Oblast, he trained at the Armed Forces sports society in Grodno.

He competed for the USSR at the 1980 Summer Olympics held in Moscow, Soviet Union where he won the silver medal in the men's 20 kilometer walk competition.

International competitions

References

Pyotr Pochinchuk's profile at Sports Reference.com
Brief biography of Pyotr Pochinchuk 

1954 births
1991 deaths
People from Lyakhavichy
Belarusian male racewalkers
Soviet male racewalkers
Olympic athletes of the Soviet Union
Olympic silver medalists for the Soviet Union
Athletes (track and field) at the 1980 Summer Olympics
World Athletics Championships athletes for the Soviet Union
European Athletics Championships medalists
Olympic silver medalists in athletics (track and field)
Medalists at the 1980 Summer Olympics
Sportspeople from Brest Region